Llandudno Albion Football Club is a Welsh football team based in Llandudno, in Conwy County Borough, Wales. They play in the Ardal Leagues North West, which is in the third tier of the Welsh football league system.

History
The club was formed in the summer of 2014 and accepted into the *Vale of Clwyd and Conwy League Division One. They finished runners-up in their first year in the league, gaining promotion to the Premier Division. They were champions in the first season in that league. In the Welsh Alliance League Division Two they were champions again at their first attempt, securing their third successive promotion. In the Welsh Alliance League Division One In their first season they finished seventh.

In February 2023, the club announced that they will fold at the end of the 2022–23 season.

Honours
Welsh Alliance League Division Two – Champions: 2016–17
Vale of Clwyd and Conwy League Premier Division – Champions: 2015–16
Vale of Clwyd and Conwy League  Division One – Runners-up: 2014–15
NWCFA Intermediate Cup – Runners-up: 2015–16
North Wales Coast FA Junior Challenge Cup – Winners: 2014–15
REM Jones Cup – Winners: 2014–15
Presidents Cup – Runners-up: 2014–15; 
Vale of Clwyd and Conwy League  Premier Division Cup – Runners-up: 2015–16
Mawddach Challenge Cup – Winners: 2017–18

References

External links
Official Pitchero website
Club official twitter

Football clubs in Wales
Sport in Conwy County Borough
Llandudno
2014 establishments in Wales
Association football clubs established in 2014
Welsh Alliance League clubs
Ardal Leagues clubs
Vale of Clwyd and Conwy Football League clubs